Seaboard Historic District is a national historic district located at Seaboard, Northampton County, North Carolina.  The district encompasses 107 contributing buildings, 1 contributing site, and 4 contributing structures in the central business district and surrounding residential sections of Seaboard.  The district developed between about 1874 and 1955 and includes notable examples of Queen Anne and Colonial Revival style architecture. Notable contributing resources include the Edwards Warehouse (c. 1910), Bradley Howell Peanut Drying and Storage Facility (c. 1950), Sidney S. Harris Gas Station (c. 1930), Stephenson-Barbee House, Edwards House, Seaboard United Methodist Church (c. 1922), Bethlehem Baptist Church (c. 1900), and Seaboard School (1927).

It was listed on the National Register of Historic Places in 2005.

References

Historic districts on the National Register of Historic Places in North Carolina
Queen Anne architecture in North Carolina
Colonial Revival architecture in North Carolina
Buildings and structures in Northampton County, North Carolina
National Register of Historic Places in Northampton County, North Carolina